The Mutual Building, in Cape Town, South Africa, was built as the headquarters of the South African Mutual Life Assurance Society, now the "Old Mutual" insurance and financial services company. It was opened in 1940, but before the end of the 1950s—less than 20 years later—business operations were already moving to another new office at Mutual Park in Pinelands (north east of the city centre); since then Old Mutual has become an international business and their present head office is in Johannesburg.

The building is a fine example of art deco architecture and design, and it has many interesting internal features such as the banking hall, assembly room, directors' board room; external features include a dramatic ziggurat structure, prismoid (triangular) windows, and one of the longest carved stone friezes in the world. It has been said that it provides evidence of the colonial attitudes of the time, and the "ideals of colonial government promulgated by Rhodes in the late nineteenth century".

The Mutual Building is now converted to residential use, although some parts of the building are used commercially.  For example, the Banking Hall (which is now an events venue) and the retail shops that operate outside on the ground level.

History

The business

The Old Mutual business has a long history. In 1845 John Fairbairn (a Scot) founded "The Mutual Life Assurance Society of the Cape of Good Hope" in Cape Town. Over the next 100 years the business was to evolve significantly, changing its name in 1885 to the "South Africa Mutual Life Assurance Society", but becoming familiarly known simply as "The Old Mutual", so as to distinguish it from newer businesses of the same kind.

The company employed women as early as 1901, expanded into Namibia in 1920 and into Zimbabwe (then Rhodesia) in 1927. Old Mutual is now an international business with offices all over the world, and its portfolio of financial services continues to evolve to meet market needs.

It is now some years since the business "de-mutualised" in order to issue shares and fund its operations using conventional investment markets.

The "new" (1940) Head Office in Darling Street

In the 1930s it became clear that a new headquarters building was needed and very ambitious targets were set for the building: it was to be the tallest building in South Africa (possibly in the whole continent of Africa, with the exception of the pyramids in Egypt), it was to have the fastest lifts, it was to have the largest windows. At the same time it was to epitomise the values of the business: "Strength, Security and Confidence in the Future"; this demanded a combination of traditional and contemporary design.

Although it is clearly identified on the exterior as the "Mutual Building" (or "Mutual Gebou" in Afrikaans) it is often familiarly referred to as "The Old Mutual Building". Here, in the body of this article, it will be referred to as the "Mutual Building", thereby acknowledging the nomenclature on the exterior of the building itself.

Search for inspiration

The figure here (adapted from www.skycrapers.com) compares the building with some of the other contemporaneous tall buildings in the world. Those involved in the design of the building travelled widely to study inspirational examples of corporate buildings elsewhere in the world. They learnt about the latest approaches to lighting, ventilation and fire protection in the US, South America, England and Sweden. In the US, the Eastern Columbia Building in Los Angeles is one example of the genre of building design that captured their attention:  this building was completed in 1930 and has also since been converted to residential occupation.

The art deco style was chosen.  However, the building is embellished with features in other styles (such as neo-classicist in the case of the banking hall) intended to reinforce the long-standing and traditional values of the Old Mutual business.

Completion

The building was completed in 1939 and opened early in 1940 with a great fanfare. The local paper provided a 16-page supplement, and South African architects and dignitaries enthused about it. In his definitive examination of the design of the building, Federico Freschi summarises the status of the building thus:

"Ultimately, the consensus suggests that the Old Mutual Building is at once a worthy monument to modern design principles and the consolidation of an important corporate and public image."

The building is listed elsewhere as a notable building, and it is regarded as an important example of the social values of the time and of the economic state of the nation, but all as seen from a European or "colonial" perspective, as explained by Freschi.

Vacating and conversion
Within 20 years (in the late 1950s) the Old Mutual began to vacate the building, moving in stages to new offices at Mutual Park in Pinelands, Cape Town. By the 1990s, only assorted tenants remained, the last of which departed in May 2003.

At this time, conversion to residential occupation began under the direction of Robert Silke at Louis Karol Architects. The name of the building was changed by the developers to Mutual Heights, a decision that did not find favour with all owners and residents involved in the new community. Despite scepticism about the name, it is generally agreed that the conversion was the first in a series of projects that re-invigorated the central business district of Cape Town.  The conversion has been the subject of a number of architecture and design awards.
 
In February 2012, the large "Old Mutual" sign on the east side of the building was removed, leaving little external evidence of the commercial origins of the building;  in 2015 Old Mutual Properties finally disposed of the remaining portions of the interior that had not been sold previously, including the banking hall, the directors suite and the fresco room.

Structure of the building

The building is constructed using reinforced concrete, filled in internally with bricks and plaster, and clad on the outside with granite. At first sight, the building is a striking example of the Art Deco style and many of its features epitomize this genre - however, some interior features deviate from true Art Deco and probably reflect the desire of the company to demonstrate solidity and traditional values at the same time as contemporaneous, forward-looking values.

In one of the meeting rooms on the eighth level (the Assembly Hall - see below), the curtains alone are more than six metres long. This generous spacing between floors was intended to achieve the greatest possible overall height for the building without exceeding the city planning limitation of 10 storeys, and it was allowed only in view of the "set back" design of the exterior structure.

Design elements

The original design of the building is attributed to Louw & Louw (Cape Town architects), working with Fred Glennie (best known at the time as a mentor to architectural students) – Mr Glennie is personally credited with most of the detailed work but Ivan Mitford-Barberton was also involved with some internal details as well as with the external granite decorations.

It is pleasing that the principal areas of the building have been so little changed over the years, especially the entrance, the banking hall, the assembly room, the directors' room, the atrium, and the windows. Even the original door handles (including the Old Mutual "logo") and the original banisters (on the staircases) are all still intact, and the atrium is largely unchanged although it is now protected from the weather by a translucent roof.

The original light fittings in the "public" areas are largely still intact, and in most parts of the building there are beautiful block-wood (parquet) floors.

Here is a selection of interior design details that exemplify the quality and attention to detail that was applied to this project by the architects, artists and designers.

The paragraphs below now visit each of the significant areas and features of the building in turn.

Features of the building

The building incorporates a range of significant features.

The Entrance Hall

Black, gold-veined onyx is used in the Darling Street foyer, the ceiling of which is over 15 metres high and finished with gold leaf, laid by Italian workmen. The view of the glass window over the door to the banking hall (above) shows the iconic ziggurat shape of the building etched into the glass. Visitors must climb 17 steps to gain access to the banking hall, and towards the top they are met by the original "pill box" where security staff can observe who (and what) is entering and leaving the building. On either side of the pill box are the entrances to the main lifts – two on the left and two on the right (there are two "staff" lifts and one "service" lift elsewhere in the building).

Characteristic stainless steel trim and light fittings, such as can be seen here, are used extensively throughout the building.

The Banking Hall

Given its tall marble-clad colonnades, the magnificent banking hall would be more properly described as an example of "neo-classicism" although the light fittings echo the art deco theme that prevails elsewhere in the building, and again we see that the glass over the doors (at the far end in the photograph below) are etched with the iconic ziggurat form that is taken by the whole building.

The two service counters that can be seen in the banking hall look identical, but only the one on the right is original—the one on the left is a later, somewhat inferior, copy.

Between the columns of the banking hall the coats of arms are presented for each of the many provinces and countries within Southern Africa in which the South African Mutual Life Assurance Society had a presence.

The banking hall is now owned privately and is available for hire as an events venue.

The lifts (elevators)

The main lifts in the building are fast ("the fastest in Africa" it was claimed when the building opened) and no expense was spared – even in the basement parking area, the lifts are trimmed with black marble.  Each door has an etched representation of an indigenous bird or animal from South Africa, with significant plants as additional decoration, or in some cases the corporate logo of the time.

The individual etchings in detail (click on the images to see the full-size version):

These designs are attributed to Ivan Mitford-Barberton.

The Assembly Room

Perhaps the best known feature of the building (in artistic circles at least) is the Assembly Room, sometimes referred to as the "Fresco Room"; Freschi indicates that this was originally intended as a facility for policy holders. Here there are striking frescoes depicting some of the history of the nation of South Africa, undertaken by Le Roux Smith Le Roux two years after the completion of the building.

Le Roux was supported in his early career by the famous British architect Herbert Baker, who provided bursaries so that Le Roux could spend time in London and elsewhere.  In London he undertook a mural in South Africa House with Eleanor Esmonde-White.  An acquaintance (still living) of Le Roux and Esmonde-White recalls that Baker insisted that Eleanor Esmonde-White be awarded a bursary, despite gender-related objections from elsewhere;  in the event she got to go to London with Le Roux, with the bursary.  Following their years in London, Le Roux was awarded this commission to work on the Mutual Building and he therefore returned to Cape Town, but only after the main building work was done - it was not sensible to undertake this meticulous work while building operations were still in progress.

These frescoes are considered elsewhere as good examples of the genre—see for example "Decopix - the Art Deco Architecture Site" where the Mutual Building itself is well represented.
The five frescoes on the end walls and over the entrance depict more than 100 years of the history of the nation, including industrial development, the Great Trek, mining following the discovery of gold, the growth of industry and agriculture, and a hint of international travel and trade. Freschi considers that ".. in contemporary terms, Le Roux's work was seen to be distinctly progressive and very much in keeping with the ostensibly liberal party line of Jan Smuts' coalition government".

The panels are reproduced below, and selected portions from them are provided in the images that follow.  

The five panels are presented left to right, in a clockwise direction when standing in the Assembly Room, back to the windows. The first and fifth are on the side walls, the second, third and fourth are on the long wall that includes the main entrance. 

The fifth image includes a representation of the Mutual Building itself, the tallest building in what is known as the "City Bowl", below the slopes of Table Mountain. This did not remain true for long, it was only one year later that the General Post Office was built on the other (seaward side) of Darling Street, and a large number of larger more modern buildings have been built since (see the views from and of the building, shown further down this page).

Some details from the panels:

In 2016 the Assembly room was purchased for private use, and with the adjoining sections of the building it is being re-finished as private accommodation.

The Directors' Rooms
On the fourth level, at the front of the building, is the Directors' Board Room.  As well as the board room there are two side rooms, one of which was a sitting room for Directors.

In the board room there is a continuous carved stinkwood frieze above the dado rail that incorporates animal and floral motifs (14 different species of birds and animals are represented). Ivan Mitford-Barberton is credited with this carving and it is probably the last work that he did in the building. Above the carved frieze is a mural designed and executed by Joyce Ord-Brown using stain on pale sycamore panelling. It represents Cape Town as the "Tavern of the Seas" in a light hearted way. The curtains are notable, being hand woven in a workshop in Eswatini (also known as Swaziland), by Coral Stephens Handweaving, a company established in the 1940s.

The selections below show some portions of the mural and the frieze, followed by some other details of the directors' rooms.  The sea plane (second picture) is probably a Martin M-130, which is not recorded as having serviced South Africa (it worked the pacific routes).  This is probably "artistic licence" on the part of Ord-Browne.

It is of note that the etched ziggurat icon on the glass over the entrance to the board room (see the enlarged version of the first image above) is not the same as that which is used elsewhere.

The Directors' suite has great heritage value but in 2015 it was re-finished and it is now used as offices for a heritage-related project management business.

The atrium

The atrium extends from the roof of the banking hall to the very top of the main building. It was originally open to the weather, but it is now protected by a translucent roof, through which the tower can be seen extending even higher.

The circular windows visible here are incorporated into the apartments that now occupy the front of the building.

The windows
The rising nature of the ziggurat mass of the exterior of the building is reinforced by the prismoid (triangular) windows, which extend up and down the height of the building. These windows are of note because they set the Mutual Building apart from some of the buildings that inspired it, for example the Eastern Columbia Building in Los Angeles. They are also functional, because they allow light to enter the building more effectively than would otherwise be the case (using the reflective properties of the inside face of the glass), and by opening and closing blinds on the one side or the other it is possible on sunny days to manage the heat entering the building as the sun traverses the sky.

Water-cooled air conditioning was another innovative feature of the original building, that avoided the need for extensive natural ventilation and allowed more freedom for the design of the windows and granite spaces between;  the same water-cooled air conditioning design is in use today.

As Freschi notes in his paper, the prismoid windows make for much more visual interest than the conventional windows in the General Post Office building. Here the image juxtaposes the Mutual building (foreground) with the General Post Office built the following year (behind).

Granite cladding
The granite cladding of the building was hewn from a single boulder on the Paarl Mountain, north east of the city of Cape Town. The cladding incorporates decorative baboon, elephant and tribal heads that project from the upper facades of the Darling Street elevation (the front of the building).

The Tribal Figures

On the Parliament Street facade there are carved granite figures representing nine ethnic African groups (not just South African) labelled thus:  "Xosa", "Pedi", "Maasai", "Matabele", "Basuto", "Barotse", "Kikuyu", "Zulu", and "Bushman". Note that the identification of the tribes does not necessarily follow current practice.

The individual figures in detail (remember you can click on the images to see the full-size version):

Recently Sanford S. Shaman has written a critique of these figures, and other features of the building
 partly based on interviews with pedestrians walking around the building.

The frieze
Around the three sides of the building facing Darling Street, Parliament Street and Longmarket Street there is a 386 feet (118 metre) frieze depicting scenes from the colonial history of South Africa, reported at its completion to be the longest such frieze in the world.

It is of interest that, at the time, it was proclaimed that the building was built by South Africans, using South African materials; while the frieze was itself designed by South African, Ivan Mitford Barberton (born in Somerset East, Eastern Cape, in 1896), the work was executed by a team of Italian immigrants led by Adolfo Lorenzi. It has recently come to light that, in the course of the work, Lorenzi's team of masons were incarcerated when the Second World War broke out in 1939, being Italian and therefore regarded  as "the enemy" at that time. They were obliged to finish their work under an armed guard.

A composite view of the frieze can be seen at the right; unfortunately in this version some portions are missing or obscured by trees in leaf.

The sections of the frieze are as follows:
The landing of Jan van Riebeeck
The arrival of the 1820 Settlers
The "Post Office Stone"
The building of the Castle of Good Hope
The emancipation of the slaves
Negotiations with Chaka (also known as "King Shaka)"
The Great Trek
The dream of Nongqawuse (other spellings are sometimes used)
Discovery of diamonds at Kimberley
Erection of a cross by Bartholomew Dias
Rhodes negotiating with the Matabele
David Livingstone preaching, healing and freeing slaves
The opening up of Tanganyika Territory
The defence of Fort Jesus depicting Arab inhabitants

A second version of this collage of the complete frieze can be found elsewhere

Views of (and from) the building

References

The learned article by Federico Freschi is particularly recommended to all who are interested in this building and its context.

External links 
 Website for the Mutual Heights Community
 Louis Karol Architects website
 Randy Juster's art deco web site
 David Thompson's art deco buildings web site
 City of Cape Town web site
 Stewart Harris' flikr photographs include some images of Fred Glennie and Le Roux Smith Le Roux at work on the building, and other interesting images of the building
 Confirmation of the Bloemfontein crest that defied identification for several years

Art Deco skyscrapers
Buildings and structures in Cape Town
Skyscrapers in Cape Town
Residential skyscrapers in South Africa
Commercial buildings completed in 1940
20th-century architecture in South Africa